Even Hotels (styled EVEN Hotels) is a hotel brand launched in 2012 by InterContinental Hotels Group with an emphasis on "wellness".

Timeline 
The company had aimed to roll out the new hotel brand initially in North America with a target of 100 hotels in five years, with the first opening in June 2014 in  Norwalk, Connecticut, with a 129-room hotel. but as of June 2021, there were 20 open hotels, though 30 additional hotels are "in the pipeline".

In 2014, additional hotels opened in Rockville, Maryland, with three more locations in New York that opened in 2015; a 150-room new build in the Garment District and the flagship 230-room tower near Grand Central Terminal, and a 204-room property in Brooklyn, New York, that opened in 2015. In 2016 a 132-room new built hotel was opened in Omaha, Nebraska.  

As of June 2021, there were 20 hotels. All room numbers are even numbers.

See also 
 Wellness tourism

References

InterContinental Hotels Group brands
Hotels established in 2012